The 2020–21 season is the 50th season in CFR Cluj's history, and the 25th in the top-flight of Romanian football. CFR Cluj is competing in Liga I and the Cupa României, having also competed in the Champions League and UEFA Europa League.

Players

First-team squad

Transfers

In

Loans in

Out

Loans out

Overall transfer activity

Expenditure
Summer:  €1,050,000

Winter:  €0

Total:  €1,050,000

Income
Summer:  €1,900,000

Winter:  €500,000

Total:  €2,400,000

Net Totals
Summer:  €850,000

Winter:  €500,000

Total:  €1,350,000

Preseason and friendlies

Competitions

Overview

Liga I

The Liga I fixture list was announced in August 2020.

Regular season

Table

Results summary

Results by round

Matches

Championship round

Table

Results summary

Position by round

Matches

Cupa României

CFR Cluj entered the Cupa României at the Round of 32.

Supercupa României

CFR Cluj will play in the Romanian Supercup as winners of the Liga I against Cupa României winners FCSB.

UEFA Champions League

As winners of the 2019-20 Liga I, CFR Cluj entered the Champions League at the first qualifying round.

First qualifying round
The draw for the first round took place on 9 August. CFR Cluj was drawn to play against Maltese champions Floriana.

Second qualifying round
CFR Cluj advanced to the second qualifying round. The draw for the second round took place on 10 August. CFR Cluj was drawn to play against Croatian champions Dinamo Zagreb.

UEFA Europa League

After losing to Dinamo Zagreb in the Champions League second qualifying round, CFR Cluj progressed to the Europa League third qualifying round.

Third qualifying round
The draw for the third round took place on 1 September. CFR Cluj were drawn to face either the Swedish champions Djurgårdens IF or the champions of Gibraltar Europa. On 17 September Djurgårdens IF won against Europa 2−1.

Play-off Round
CFR Cluj advanced to the play-off round. The draw for the play-off round took place on 18 September. CFR Cluj was drawn to play against Finnish champions KuPS.

Group stage

CFR Cluj progressed to the Europa League group stage. The draw was be held on 2 October. CFR Cluj was drawn with Roma, Young Boys and CSKA Sofia.

Statistics

Appearances and goals

|-
|colspan="18"|Players who appeared for CFR Cluj that left during the season:
|-

|}

Squad statistics
{|class="wikitable" style="text-align: center;"
|-
!
! style="width:70px;"|Liga I
! style="width:70px;"|Cupa României
! style="width:70px;"|Supercupa României
! style="width:70px;"|UEFA Champions League
! style="width:70px;"|UEFA Europa League
! style="width:70px;"|Home
! style="width:70px;"|Away
! style="width:70px;"|Neutral
! style="width:70px;"|Total Stats
|-
|align=left|Games played       || 40 || 1 || 1 || 2 || 8 || 25 || 26 || 1 || 52
|-
|align=left|Games won          || 26 || 0 || 0 || 1 || 3 || 12 || 18 || 0 || 30
|-
|align=left|Games drawn        || 6 || 0 || 1 || 1 || 2 || 8 || 3 || 1 || 12
|-
|align=left|Games lost         || 6 || 1 || 0 || 0 || 3 || 5 || 5 || 0 || 10
|-
|align=left|Goals scored       || 57 || 0 || 0 || 4 || 8 || 36 || 33 || 0 || 69
|-
|align=left|Goals conceded     || 20 || 1 || 0 || 2 || 11 || 16 || 18 || 0 || 34
|-
|align=left|Goal difference    || 37 || −1 || 0 || 2 || −3 || 20 || 15 || 0 || 35
|-
|align=left|Clean sheets       || 25 || 0 || 1 || 1 || 3 || 13 || 16 || 1 || 30
|-
|align=left|Goal by Substitute || 0 || 0 || 0 || 0 || 0 || 0 || 0 || 0 || 0
|-
|align=left|Total shots        || – || – || – || – || – || – || – || – || –
|-
|align=left|Shots on target    || – || – || – || – || – || – || – || – || –
|-
|align=left|Corners            || – || – || – || – || – || – || – || – || –
|-
|align=left|Players used       || – || – || – || – || – || – || – || – || –
|-
|align=left|Offsides           || – || – || – || – || – || – || – || – || –
|-
|align=left|Fouls suffered     || – || – || – || – || – || – || – || – || –
|-
|align=left|Fouls committed    || – || – || – || – || – || – || – || – || –
|-
|align=left|Yellow cards       || 0 || 0 || 0 || 0 || 0 || 0 || 0 || 0 || 0
|-
|align=left|Red cards          || 0 || 0 || 0 || 0 || 0 || 0 || 0 || 0 || 0
|-
|align=left|Winning rate       || 0% || 0% || 0% || 0% || 0% || 0% || 0% || 0% || 0%
|-

Goalscorers

Goal minutes

Hat-tricks

Clean sheets

Disciplinary record

See also
 2020–21 Cupa României
 2020–21 Liga I

References

CFR Cluj seasons
CFR, Cluj
CFR, Cluj
CFR, Cluj
Romanian football championship-winning seasons